A trilithon or trilith is a structure consisting of two large vertical stones (posts) supporting a third stone set horizontally across the top (lintel). It is commonly used in the context of megalithic monuments. The most famous trilithons are those of Stonehenge in England.

The word trilithon is derived from Greek 'having three stones' (τρι- tri- 'three' + λίθος líthos 'stone') and was first used in its modern archaelogical sense by William Stukeley.

Other famous trilithons include those found in the Megalithic temples of Malta (which like Stonehenge are a UNESCO World Heritage Site), the Osireion in Egypt, and the Haʻamonga ʻa Maui in Tonga, Polynesia. The term is also used to describe the groups of three stones in the Hunebed tombs of the Netherlands.

See also 
 Dolmen
 Henge
 Megalithic architectural elements
 Menhir (standing stone)

Citations

General sources 

Archaeological features
Architectural history
Megalithic monuments
Monoliths
Stone Age
Stonehenge